Michael Chua is a film producer, film director and poet from Singapore.  Michael graduated from the Film, Sound and Video department of Ngee Ann Polytechnic in 1997. Upon embarking on his professional career, he has directed and shot various projects of different genres, including music videos, commercials, TV dramas and feature length movies.

In 2013, Michael started Skyshot with his business partner to add aerial and drones capabilities to his work.

Selected filmography

Director of Photography
Home (Music video) (starring Kit Chan)
Water (Music video)
Moments of Magic (Music video) (starring Fann Wong)
Kleenex (TV Commercial)
Guan Xin Tai (TV Commercial)
Indocafe (TV Commercial)
The Best Bet (Feature Length Movie)
Love Poetry (Telemovie) MediaCorp 5

Director

Incredible Tales (Horror) MediaCorp 5
Beach 360 (Travelogue) HD Channel Mediacorp
Full Circle (Docu-Drama) MediaCorp 5
Beyond the Dot (6x30min Infotainment) Channel News Asia
Singapore Arrival Video (Inflight Entertainment)
Health Sciences Authority (Corporate Video)

Executive Producer

ALYA (13 X 1 hour Drama) (HD) Indonesia TV
Oh Lucy! (22min Short Film)

Awards
Shadow of Death (Director of Photography)
Special Achievement Award at the Singapore International Film Festival 1997
Invited for screening at the BBC International Short Film Festival
Saying Goodbye (Director)
Finalist at the Singapore International Film Festival 1997
His Name Was Wong (Director of Photography)
Finalist at the Singapore International Film Festival 1997
Sons (Director of Photography)
Best Film & Special Achievement Award at the Singapore International Film Festival 2000
Oh Lucy (Executive Producer)
Official Selection and 2nd Prize at the Cinéfondation 2014

External links
Upside Down Concepts
TBOX Systems
Skyshot
Alta Productions
Watch my A** Official site
Life Before Death

References

Year of birth missing (living people)
Living people
Singaporean film directors
Singaporean people of Chinese descent
Ngee Ann Polytechnic alumni